The two Autonomous Regions of Portugal from 1999 are the Azores (Região Autónoma dos Açores) and Madeira (Região Autónoma da Madeira). Together with Continental Portugal (Portugal Continental), they form the Portuguese Republic.

History
The autonomous regions were established in 1976 in the aftermath of the Carnation Revolution, which saw Portugal end its colonial empire. Some areas, such as the Azores, Madeira and Macau, were deemed either impractical to decolonise or too close in ties to Continental Portugal to make independent. However, due to their distinct geography, economy, social and cultural situation, as well as historical aspirations of autonomy in Madeira and the Azores, the autonomous regions were formed. When formed in 1976, there were three autonomous regions - the Azores, Madeira, and Macau (Região Autónoma de Macau) in Asia. Macau, by far the most populous and the wealthiest of the three regions, was handed over to China in 1999, leaving Portugal with two Autonomous Regions.

Constitution
Although the regions are politically and administratively autonomous, the Portuguese constitution specifies both a regional and national connection, obliging their administrations to maintain democratic principles and promote regional interests, while still reinforcing national unity. The third clause of article 255 of the Portuguese Constitution specifically points to maintenance of national integrity and sovereignty of the Portuguese State.

Administration
As defined by the Portuguese constitution and other laws, an autonomous region possesses its own political and administrative statute and has its own government. The branches of Government are the regional executive (Governo Regional) and the legislative assembly (known as the Assembleia Regional). The assembly is elected by universal suffrage, using the D'Hondt method of proportional representation.

Originally, the sovereignty of the Portuguese Republic was represented in each autonomous region by the Minister of the Republic (Ministro da República), proposed by the Government of the Republic and appointed by the President of the Republic. After the sixth amendment to the Portuguese Constitution was passed in 2006, the Minister of the Republic was replaced by a less-powerful Representative of the Republic (Representante da República) who is appointed by the President, after listening to the Government, but otherwise it is a presidential prerogative.

In Macau (an autonomous region from 1976 to 1999), the office of Governor (Governador de Macau) was uniquely preserved, and held powers equivalent to both the President of the Regional Executive and the President of the Regional Government in the Azores and Madeira, though the rest of the city’s political structure aligned with the other two autonomous regions.

The president of the regional executive (the Presidente do Governo Regional) is appointed by the Representative of the Republic according to the results of the election to the legislative assemblies.

Current Presidents of the Regional Executive:

 Azores – José Manuel Bolieiro (Social Democratic Party)
 Madeira – Miguel Albuquerque (Social Democratic Party)

See also
 Legislative Assembly of the Azores
 Legislative Assembly of Madeira
 Legislative Assembly of Macau

References

 
Government of Portugal
Subdivisions of Portugal